This is a list of all Media of Nepal which includes radio, television, newspapers, magazines and online portals.

A
ABC Television
Avenues Television

H

Himal Khabarpatrika
Himalaya Television

I

Image Channel

K

Kantipur Television
Karobar Economic Daily

M
Mountain Television

N

Nepal Television
News 24

O

 Online Khabar

R

 Radio Kapilvastu
 Radio Nepal
 Radio Sagarmatha
 Radio Lumbini
 Radio Jayaprithvi F.M Bajhang

S

Sagarmatha Television
sajhasabal.com https://sajhasabal.com/

T

Terai Television
The Himalayan Times
The Kathmandu Post
The Rising Nepal

References